Catonephele is a nymphalid butterfly genus found in Mexico, Central America, South America, and the West Indies.

Species
Listed alphabetically:

 Catonephele acontius (Linnaeus, 1771) – Acontius firewing
 Catonephele antinoe (Godart, [1824]) – Antinoe catone
 Catonephele chromis (Doubleday, [1848]) – cloud-forest catone
 Catonephele cortesi Maza, 1982 – West-Mexican catone
 Catonephele mexicana Jenkins & Maza, 1985 – Guatemalan catone
 Catonephele numilia (Cramer, [1775]) – blue-frosted banner, blue-frosted catone, Grecian shoemaker, or stoplight catone
 Catonephele nyctimus (Westwood, 1850)
 Catonephele orites Stichel, 1899 – orange-banded shoemaker butterfly
 Catonephele sabrina (Hewitson, 1851)
 Catonephele salacia (Hewitson, 1851)
 Catonephele salambria (C. & R. Felder, 1861) – Salambria banner

References

Biblidinae
Nymphalidae of South America
Taxa named by Jacob Hübner
Nymphalidae genera